Anna Di Lellio is a sociologist, journalist and former United Nations consultant. She has written on a number of topics relating to the United Nations' presence in Kosovo and Iraq. She graduated with a Ph.D. in sociology from Columbia University and a Masters in Public Policy and International Affairs from New York University.

She worked for the UN World Food Program as a consultant in Kosovo and East Timor during the 1999 emergencies and later in 2003 as the political advisor to the UN Kosovo Police Corps Coordinator. From 2001 through 2003, she was the Temporary Media Commissioner of Kosovo for the Organisation for Economic Co-operation and Development (OSCE). In this capacity, she authored two reports on media law and policy in post-conflict areas. On her return to New York, she was appointed as Director of Communications to Paul Volcker's inquiry into possible corruption in the Iraqi Oil for Food program. She resigned her post in September 2004 following a controversy over a 2002 newspaper article in The Guardian in which she criticized George W. Bush and Silvio Berlusconi.

She is the editor of the book The Case for Kosova: Passage to Independence, an anthology of essays on the future of Kosovo.

According to historian Dušan Bataković, In her writings, Di Lellio takes a pro-Albanian stance.

References

American book editors
Year of birth missing (living people)
Columbia Graduate School of Arts and Sciences alumni
New York University alumni
Living people
American officials of the United Nations
United Nations Oil-for-Food scandal
World Food Programme people